The 2013–14 Czech Women's First League is the 21st season of the Czech Republic's top-tier football league for women. Sparta Praha were the defending champions. For the first time two teams qualify to the Champions League, because the Czech Republic entered the top eight nations in the UEFA Coefficients for women.

The championship was won by Slavia for the third time, and the first time since 2004. Slavia's win over Sparta at the penultimate matchday ended their nine-year-long title streak.

Format
The eight teams will play each other twice for a total of 14 matches per team. After that the top four teams will play a championship round for another six matches per team. The bottom placed four teams play the relegation round. Points accumulated after the regular season are halved and added the points from the next round. The champion and runners-up qualify for the UEFA Women's Champions League.

Regular season

Standings
The regular season ended on 16 April 2014.

Results

Final stage
Points of the regular season were halved and rounded up, goal difference was kept.

Championship group
Played by the teams placed first to fourth of the regular season. Teams play each other twice.

Relegation group
Played by the teams placed fifth to eighth of the regular season. Teams play each other twice.

Personnel and kits

Note: Flags indicate national team as has been defined under FIFA eligibility rules. Players may hold more than one non-FIFA nationality.

References

2013–14 domestic women's association football leagues
2013–14 in Czech football
Czech Women's First League seasons